Lili Anne Taylor (born February 20, 1967) is an American actress. She came to prominence with supporting parts in the films Mystic Pizza (1988) and Say Anything... (1989), before establishing herself as one of the key figures of 1990s independent cinema with starring roles in Bright Angel (1990), Dogfight (1991), Household Saints, Short Cuts (both 1993), The Addiction, Cold Fever (both 1995), I Shot Andy Warhol,  Girls Town (both 1996), Pecker (1998), and A Slipping-Down Life (1999). She is the recipient of four Independent Spirit nominations, winning once in the category of Best Supporting Female. Her accolades also include a Golden Globe, an NBR Award, a Volpi Cup, a Sant Jordi, a Golden Space Needle, a Chlotrudis Award, an SDFCS Award, a Sundance Special Jury Prize, and a Fangoria Chainsaw Award.

Alongside her work on smaller-scale projects, Taylor has encountered mainstream success with parts in films such as Born on the Fourth of July (1989), Rudy (1993), Ransom (1996), The Haunting (1999), High Fidelity (2000), Brooklyn's Finest, Public Enemies (both 2009), The Conjuring (2013), and Maze Runner: The Scorch Trials (2015). Her other credits include Julie Johnson (2001), Factotum, The Notorious Bettie Page (both 2005), Starting Out in the Evening (2007), The Promotion (2008), Being Flynn (2012), To the Bone, Leatherface (both 2017), Eli (2019), and Paper Spiders (2020).

Outside of film, Taylor has starred in the television series State of Mind (2007), Almost Human (2013–2014), Hemlock Grove (2013–2014), Chambers (2019) and Perry Mason (2020), as well as all three seasons of the ABC drama American Crime (2015–2017), earning a nomination for the Emmy Award for Outstanding Lead Actress for her portrayal of Anne Blaine in the latter. For her guest roles on The X-Files (Marty Glenn; 1998) and Six Feet Under (Lisa Kimmel; 2002–2005), she received a further two Emmy nominations in the category of Outstanding Guest Actress. Taylor's stage credits include Broadway productions of Anton Chekhov's Three Sisters (1997) and Scott McPherson's Marvin's Room (2017). She is married to playwright Nick Flynn, with whom she has a daughter.

Early life
Taylor, the fifth of six children, was born in Glencoe, Illinois, a north suburb of Chicago, to Marie (née Lecour) and George Park Taylor, an artist and hardware store operator. She grew up in a "warm family environment", and has described herself as being "a bit of a searcher" during her childhood. She graduated from New Trier High School in Winnetka, Illinois in 1985. Thereafter, she attended The Theatre School at DePaul University before being cut from the acting program, and the Piven Theatre Workshop.

Career
Taylor has appeared in dozens of films since 1988, including Dogfight, Mystic Pizza, and Rudy. Her work has mostly been in independent films and theater. She played Lisa Kimmel Fisher (mostly in the second and third seasons) in the HBO drama Six Feet Under for which she was nominated for an Emmy Award. Taylor played supporting roles in Mystic Pizza (1988) and Say Anything... (1989). She starred in Dogfight (1991) directed by Nancy Savoca, in which she played an unattractive young woman who is taken to a cruel contest by a Marine (played by River Phoenix) under the pretense of a date. In 1991, she played Grace, the witty and romantic step-daughter of Faye Dunaway, in Arizona Dream (released 1993), directed by Emir Kusturica, co-starring Johnny Depp, Vincent Gallo and Jerry Lewis. In 1993 too, she re-teamed with Savoca for Household Saints. Director Robert Altman hired Taylor in 1993 for his epic Los Angeles drama Short Cuts, in which Taylor shared scenes with Lily Tomlin. Taylor portrayed Valerie Solanas in Mary Harron's I Shot Andy Warhol (1996). The same year, she co-starred in Girls Town with Bruklin Harris and Aunjanue Ellis, where three inner-city friends dealt with a friend's suicide, and later in Ransom, as caterer who helps her corrupt policeman boyfriend kidnap a rich man's son.

In 1998 she appeared in the X-Files episode "Mind's Eye", and was nominated for a Primetime Emmy Award for Outstanding Guest Actress in a Drama Series. The same year, she appeared in John Waters' film Pecker, alongside Edward Furlong, Christina Ricci and Mary Kay Place. In 1999, Taylor starred in Jan de Bont's remake of The Haunting. In 2001, Taylor appeared in the independent feature Julie Johnson. The film, co-starring Courtney Love, centered on a Long Island mother and housewife who leaves her husband to pursue her dream of studying science. In early 2004, Taylor made her New York City stage debut in Wallace Shawn's Aunt Dan and Lemon in the role of Lemon.

Taylor won the 2005 Best Actress award at the Copenhagen International Film Festival for her role in Factotum. In 2006, Taylor worked again with Mary Harron in The Notorious Bettie Page. She starred in the Lifetime cable network's hour-long comedy-drama series State of Mind, as a New Haven therapist dealing with a divorce and a parade of quirky clients. She played the daughter of Frank Langella's character in Andrew Wagner's 2007 drama Starting Out in the Evening. In the 2008 film The Promotion, Taylor played Lori Wehlner, the wife of John C. Reilly's character. In 2009, Taylor played Sheriff Lillian Holley of Lake County, Indiana, who incarcerates John Dillinger (played by Johnny Depp), in Michael Mann's Public Enemies. In 2011, Fence Books released Taylor's audio recording of poet Ariana Reines' Save The World. In 2013, Taylor starred in the horror hit The Conjuring.

In 2014, Taylor starred alongside Chloë Grace Moretz in the off-Broadway play The Library directed by Steven Soderbergh. The following year she co-starred in Maze Runner: The Scorch Trials, as Dr. Mary Cooper, "a doctor who helps Thomas and his fellow Gladers". Filming began at the end of October, and the movie was released on September 18, 2015. In 2020, Taylor starred opposite Stefania LaVie Owen in Paper Spiders.

Personal life
In 2009, Taylor married writer Nick Flynn. They have a daughter Maeve.

In May 1997, Taylor's former boyfriend, actor Michael Rapaport, was arrested for harassing Taylor and charged with two counts of aggravated harassment. He pleaded guilty to the charges. New York Supreme Court Justice Arlene Goldberg issued a protection order forbidding him from contacting Taylor and requiring him to undergo counseling.

Taylor is an activist for conservation issues, particularly those having to do with birds, and sits on the boards of the American Birding Association and National Audubon Society. She introduced Louise Post and Nina Gordon, founding members of 1990s alternative band Veruca Salt, in the early 1990s.

Awards
Taylor is a three-time Primetime Emmy Award nominee. Also recognized for her extensive work in American independent film, she has been nominated for four Independent Spirit Awards, winning Best Supporting Female for her performance in Household Saints (1993). She was nominated for Best Female Lead for Bright Angel (1990) and The Addiction (1995), and again for Best Supporting Female for Girls Town (1996). In 1996, she received a Special Recognition award from the Sundance Film Festival for her performance in Mary Harron's I Shot Andy Warhol, in which she portrayed Valerie Solanas. Ten years later, in 2006, she was honored with the Excellence in Acting Award at the Provincetown International Film Festival.

Filmography

Film

Television

Stage credits

References

External links
 
 
 

Living people
20th-century American actresses
21st-century American actresses
Actresses from Illinois
American film actresses
American stage actresses
American television actresses
DePaul University alumni
Independent Spirit Award for Best Supporting Female winners
New Trier High School alumni
People from Glencoe, Illinois
Volpi Cup winners
1967 births